SEC or Sec may refer to:

Companies
Solar Entertainment Corporation, a Filipino media company
Samsung Electronics Co., Ltd., an electronics company

Government
Securities and Exchange Commission (disambiguation)
U.S. Securities and Exchange Commission
State Electricity Commission of Victoria, Australia
State Examinations Commission, Ireland
State-owned Enterprises Commission, Taiwan

Science
Saga execution coordinator, a component of the saga interaction pattern in computer science
Bacterial secretion system#Sec system, the Sec secretion system in bacteria
Secant function, in mathematics
Size-exclusion chromatography
Space Weather Prediction Center, formerly Space Environment Center
Selenocysteine, an amino acid
Secondary Electron Conduction Tube, part of the Apollo TV camera

Sports
Southeastern Conference, one of the major U.S. collegiate sports conferences
Southeast Conference in the Wisconsin Interscholastic Athletic Association 
Speedway European Championship, motorcycle speedway competition

Other uses
Dalek Sec, a Doctor Who character
Scottish Episcopal Church
Sec (wine), a French term used to indicate the sweetness level of a wine
SEC Armadillo (part of Scottish Event Campus), an auditorium located near the River Clyde, in Glasgow, Scotland.
SEC Centre (part of Scottish Event Campus), Scotland's largest exhibition centre, located in Glasgow, Scotland. 
Secco, a musical term meaning "dry", "without resonance" or "quick"
Second, a unit of time
St Edmund's College, Ipswich, UK

See also
 Seč (disambiguation)
 Sxc (disambiguation)